Noyabud (also, Noyabut) is a village in the Astara Rayon of Azerbaijan.  The village forms part of the municipality of Burzubənd.

References 

Populated places in Astara District